The Java loach (Pangio oblonga) is a species of tropical freshwater fish, an unbanded kuhli loach, native to the sandy streams of Southeast Asia. Its alternative common names include the black kuhli (loach), chocolate kuhli and cinnamon loach. It is  common in the aquarium trade.

Description and behavior 
The java loach, like its fellow Pangio species, has a long eel-like body with small eyes set high in the skull. Its rayed dorsal fin is set far back on the dorsal side, halfway between the tail and middle of the fish. The tail ends with a flat edge and may be slightly forked in the middle.

Due to the large range of the java loach, coloration varies between populations. Individuals carry a solid color of red-brown to chocolate brown to near black on their dorsal side, while the ventral side is pale by contrast.

Java loaches grow to 3 inches (8 cm) and readily scavenge bits of food from soft substrate. They will accept flake food in aquaria but prefer a meaty diet of Mysis shrimp, brine shrimp, bloodworms, etc. They are a social species best kept in large groups of five or more. The species darts into the substrate when it feels threatened. Sexual dimorphism is not readily apparent, although females carrying eggs will appear fatter.

Like many other loach species, they are known to not breed often in captivity without certain hormones. There is a recording of breeding this species in home aquaria, however.

Distribution 
The Mekong River basin of Laos, Cambodia, Thailand and Vietnam
Chao Phraya River Basin and Nan River, Thailand
Seroke Stream and Darjiling River, India
Dangtong River, Cambodia
Sungai Pinoh River, Borneo and Thailand
Brang and Tersat Rivers, Malaysia
Mandalay and Tenasserim Divisions, Myanmar (Burma)

Habitat 
P. oblonga, like most loaches, lives in streambeds. In the wild and in optimal aquarium conditions, the water pH is from 6.2 to 7.0 and the temperature ranges from 76° to 82 °F, or 24° to 28 °C.

See also 
 Kuhli loach Comparable striped species.

References 
Pangio oblonga Loaches Online.

External links
Black Kuhli Loach Fact Sheet 

Pangio
Fish described in 1846